This list of Westpac buildings includes a number of notable (often heritage-listed) buildings, currently or formerly used by the Westpac Bank or its predecessor institutitions including Bank of New South Wales.

New South Wales 
 Westpac Place, Sydney

Queensland 
 Bank of New South Wales building, Brisbane
 Bank of New South Wales building, Charters Towers
 Westpac Bank Building, Cooktown
 Bank of New South Wales building, Helidon
 Bank of New South Wales building, Gympie
 Bank of New South Wales building, Maryborough
 Westpac Bank building, Normanton
 Bank of New South Wales building, Townsville
 Bank of New South Wales building, Yungaburra

South Australia 
 Westpac House, Adelaide

Victoria
 * Bank of New South Wales building, Melbourne

References

Westpac
Westpac
Buildings
Westpac buildings